John B. Smith was a member of the Wisconsin State Senate from 1849 to 1850 representing the 19th district. He was a Democrat.

Born in Old Town, Maine on September 11, 1811, he moved to Milwaukee, Wisconsin Territory and was in the lumber business. He was also in the railroad business and helped edited the Free Democrat newspaper. He died on January 3, 1879, in Milwaukee, Wisconsin.

References

Democratic Party Wisconsin state senators
1811 births
1879 deaths
People from Old Town, Maine
Politicians from Milwaukee
Businesspeople from Milwaukee
Editors of Wisconsin newspapers
19th-century American journalists
American male journalists
19th-century American male writers
19th-century American politicians
19th-century American businesspeople